The Utsiktens BK is a Swedish football club located in Västra Frölunda, near Gothenburg.

Background
Since their foundation in 1935 Utsiktens BK has participated mainly in the middle and lower divisions of the Swedish football league system. Utsikten got its name after a tower in Slottsskogen, which also can be seen in the crest. The club currently plays in Division 1 which is the third tier of Swedish football. They play their home matches at the Ruddalens IP in Västra Frölunda,  Gothenburg. Utsiktens BK are affiliated to the Göteborgs Fotbollförbund.

Players

First-team squad

Management

Organisation

Technical staff

Season to season

Attendances

In recent seasons Utsiktens BK have had the following average attendances:

Achievements

League
 Division 1 Södra:
 Winners (1): 2014

Footnotes

References

External links
 Utsiktens BK – Official website

 
Football clubs in Gothenburg
Association football clubs established in 1935
1935 establishments in Sweden
Football clubs in Västra Götaland County